The 2004–05 Mid-American Conference women's basketball season began with practices in October 2004, followed by the start of the 2004–05 NCAA Division I women's basketball season in November. Conference play began in January 2005 and concluded in March 2005. Bowling Green won the regular season title with a record of 13–3. Kate Endress of Ball State was MAC player of the year.

Regular season champion Bowling Green won the MAC tournament over seventh seeded Kent State. Kate Achter of Bowling Green was the tournament MVP. Bowling Green lost to Kansas State in the first of the NCAA tournament. Eastern Michigan played in the WNIT.

Preseason Awards 
The preseason poll was announced by the league office on October 20, 2004.

Preseason women's basketball coaches poll

East Division 
Miami

West Division 
Eastern Michigan

Honors

Postseason

Mid–American Tournament

NCAA Tournament

Women's National Invitational Tournament

Postseason Awards 

Coach of the Year: Curt Miller, Bowling Green
Player of the Year: Kate Endress, Ball State
Freshman of the Year: Heather Turner, Buffalo
Defensive Player of the Year: Malika Willoughby, Kent State
Sixth Man of the Year: Simone Redd, Ohio

Honors

See also
2004–05 Mid-American Conference men's basketball season

References